Sorbus wilmottiana, the Willmott's whitebeam, is a species of whitebeam in the family Rosaceae. It is endemic to England, and is found in the Avon Gorge, in Somerset and Gloucestershire.  It is threatened by habitat loss.

Description
Sorbus wilmottiana is a small tree or shrub, up to 10m in height. It is often multistemmed, with rather upright branches.

Distribution
This species is confined to the Avon Gorge, in SW England; less than 100 individuals are known.

Ecology and Evolution
Sorbus wilmottiana appears to be shade intolerant, growing in rocky scrub and grassland on shallow, mildly acidic soils. Sorbus wilmottiana arose from a cross between Sorbus aria and Sorbus porrigentiformis.

References

External links
 

Endemic flora of England
wilmottiana
Critically endangered plants
Environment of Somerset
Environment of Gloucestershire
Taxonomy articles created by Polbot